Nototrichium is a genus of flowering plants in the family Amaranthaceae.  All members of the genus are endemic to the Hawaiian Islands. They are known in Hawaiian as kuluī.

Species
Nototrichium divaricatum Lorence (Kauai)
Nototrichium humile Hillebr. (Oahu, Maui)
Nototrichium sandwicense (A.Gray) Hillebr. (main islands of Hawaii)

References

External links

Amaranthaceae
Endemic flora of Hawaii
Amaranthaceae genera